Jonathan Rothschild (born 1955) is an American lawyer and politician who served as the 41st mayor of Tucson, Arizona from 2011 to 2019. From 2001 to 2011, Rothschild was managing partner at the law firm Mesch Clark Rothschild.

Early life and education
Rothschild was born to a Jewish family and attended Canyon del Oro High School in Oro Valley, Arizona. He later graduated from Kenyon College and the University of New Mexico School of Law. After graduating from law school, he served as a clerk for United States District Court Judge Alfredo Chavez Marquez.

Career 
Rothschild was first elected mayor of Tucson on November 8, 2011, with 54.96% of the vote, defeating Republican Rick Grinnell (39.91%) and Green Party candidate Mary DeCamp (4.94%) after running unopposed in the Democratic primary. In 2015, he was elected to a second term, running unopposed in both primary and general elections.

He has also been an adjunct assistant professor of the University of Arizona College of Law and a past chair of the State Bar of Arizona's Committee on Examinations. He has served as treasurer of the Pima County Democratic Party.

See also
 List of mayors of the largest 50 US cities

References

External links
 

1955 births
21st-century American politicians
Arizona Democrats
Arizona lawyers
Jewish mayors of places in the United States
Kenyon College alumni
Living people
Mayors of Tucson, Arizona
University of New Mexico School of Law alumni
Jewish American people in Arizona politics
21st-century American Jews